Butler Township is a township in Butler County, Pennsylvania, United States. The population was 17,248 at the 2010 census. The township was first settled by Europeans in 1795. It was established as a township in 1804 and as a first class township in 1922.

Geography
Butler Township is located near the center of Butler County and surrounds the city of Butler, the county seat. The township contains the unincorporated communities of Homeacre-Lyndora, Meridian, Meadowood, and Oak Hills, all of which are census-designated places. The unincorporated town of Lyndora, which has its own post office (zip code 16045), is located within Butler Township.

Connoquenessing Creek, a tributary of the Beaver River, flows to the southwest out of Butler city and crosses the southern part of the township. In 2000, a scientific study was conducted to determine the health of the creek. Researchers discovered that only the Mississippi River received more toxic materials than the Connoquenessing, making the small river the second most polluted waterway in the United States. At the time, the Armco Inc. steel facility in Butler ranked first nationally for the amount of pollutant discharges. However, by 2010, due to reduced industry and clean up efforts, the creek's health has significantly recovered and has become popular for water-sport activities.

Demographics

As of the census of 2010, there were 17,248 people, 7,409 households, and 4,880 families residing in the township.  The population density was 799.2 people per square mile (308.6/km2).  There were 7,500 housing units at an average density of 348.8/sq mi (134.7/km2).  The racial makeup of the township was 98.1% White, 0.5% African American, 0.5% Asian, 0.1% Pacific Islander, and 0.4% from two or more races. Hispanic or Latino of any race were 0.4% of the population.

There were 7,201 households, out of which 26.0% had children under the age of 18 living with them, 57.0% were married couples living together, 7.8% had a female householder with no husband present, and 32.1% were non-families. 28.8% of all households were made up of individuals, and 14.5% had someone living alone who was 65 years of age or older.  The average household size was 2.33 and the average family size was 2.87.

In the township the population was spread out, with 20.7% under the age of 18, 5.9% from 18 to 24, 25.4% from 25 to 44, 26.9% from 45 to 64, and 21.1% who were 65 years of age or older.  The median age was 44 years. For every 100 females, there were 93.3 males.  For every 100 females age 18 and over, there were 90.3 males.

The median income for a household in the township was $41,274, and the median income for a family was $51,824. Males had a median income of $41,486 versus $24,818 for females. The per capita income for the township was $21,218.  About 5.0% of families and 6.9% of the population were below the poverty line, including 6.7% of those under age 18 and 10.4% of those age 65 or over.

Neighborhoods

Bon Aire
The Boulevard
Bredinville
Castle Heights
Grandview
Greenwood Village
Highfield
Homeacre
Lyndora
Meadowood
Meridian
North Butler
Oak Hills
Stirling Glen
Westwood Manor

Education
 Butler Area School District
Butler Intermediate High School

Butler Senior High School

McQuistion Elementary

Meridian Elementary

Northwest Elementary
 Butler County Area Vocational-Technical School
 Butler County Community College (BC3)

Economy

The main shopping corridor is on New Castle Road and features an array of strip malls and shops. Below is a list of the shopping areas within the township:
 Alameda Plaza
 Bon Aire Plaza
 Butler Commons, formally the Butler Mall
 Butler Crossing
 Greater Butler Mart
 Greenwood Plaza
 Moraine Pointe Plaza
 Point Plaza

Health
 Butler Memorial Hospital
The Veterans Affairs Medical Center (VA Butler Healthcare). The new VA Healthcare Center is on  just over the line in Center Township.

Parks and recreation
 Alameda Park, owned and operated by Butler County is entirely within Butler Township. It was once an early amusement park with a small lake. All but the shell of the carousel remains, which has been converted into a pavilion. The lake is also gone. The park is heavily forested and features several hiking trails. The lower portion of Alameda Park Road has been closed to automotive traffic since 2007, but is still open to walking, biking, and running. The park also features a public swimming pool, several picnic shelters, a carousel shelter, two playgrounds, sand volleyball courts, and a bocce court.
 Butler Township Park, owned and operated by the township, there are walking trails, a playground, a dek hockey rink and a large hall that is available for rental. 
 Highfield Park, has several baseball fields, playground and a hall that can be rented.
Preston Park, was the private estate of scientist Dr. Frank W. Preston, a prominent local figure. Upon the death of his wife Jane in 2008, the property was left to the township. The park includes a large pond, the Preston's house and laboratory, an arboretum of several dozen coniferous tree species, a prairie, and the largest examples of several coniferous tree species in Pennsylvania. Listed on the National Register of Historic Places. 
Krendale Golf Course, a 27-hole public golf course 
Aubrey's Golf Course, an 18-hole public golf course

Transportation
Pennsylvania Route 68 (Evans City Road/East Jefferson Street) and PA Route 356 (New Castle Road/Center Avenue/Freeport Road) are major roads in the township. PA Route 8 (Pittsburgh Road and North Main Street Extension) passes through the township in a north–south direction on either side of the city limits of Butler. U.S. Route 422, a limited-access highway, runs through the township near its northern edge as it bypasses the city.

The township is also served by The Bus, operated by the Butler Transit Authority.

Sports  
See Sports of Butler, Pennsylvania (City)

Media 
See Media of Butler, Pennsylvania (City)

Notable people 
See Notable People of Butler, Pennsylvania (City)

See also
 Butler, Pennsylvania (City)
Butler County, Pennsylvania
National Register of Historic Places listings in Butler County

References

External links
 Butler Township official website
 Butler Area School District
 Butler County Historical Society
 Butler County Tourism and Convention Bureau
 1883 History of Butler County

Populated places established in 1795
Pittsburgh metropolitan area
Townships in Butler County, Pennsylvania